Kollweiler is a municipality in the district of Kaiserslautern, in Rhineland-Palatinate, western Germany.

Geography

Kollweiler lies in the Northern Pfalz. To the north are the towns of Jettenbach and Rothselberg, and to the south are the towns of Schwedelbach and Reichenbach-Steegen.

History

Even before the Romans, Celtic descendants settled the area around Kollweiler.

References

Municipalities in Rhineland-Palatinate
Kaiserslautern (district)